TIMIT is a corpus of phonemically and lexically transcribed speech of American English speakers of different sexes and dialects.  Each transcribed element has been delineated in time.

TIMIT was designed to further acoustic-phonetic knowledge and automatic speech recognition systems.  It was commissioned by DARPA and corpus design was a joint effort between the Massachusetts Institute of Technology, SRI International, and Texas Instruments (TI). The speech was recorded at TI, transcribed at MIT, and verified and prepared for publishing by the National Institute of Standards and Technology (NIST). There is also a telephone bandwidth version called NTIMIT (Network TIMIT).  

TIMIT and NTIMIT are not freely available — either membership of the Linguistic Data Consortium, or a monetary payment, is required for access to the dataset.

History
The TIMIT telephone corpus was an early attempt to create a database with speech samples. It was published in the year 1988 on CD-ROM and consists of only 10 sentences per speaker. Two 'dialect' sentences were read by each speaker, as well as another 7 sentences selected from a larger set  Each sentence averages 3 seconds long and is spoken by 630 different speakers. It was the first notable attempt in creating and distributing a speech corpus and the overall project has produced costs of 1.5 million US$.

The full name of the project is DARPA-TIMIT Acoustic-Phonetic Continuous Speech Corpus and the acronym TIMIT stands for Texas Instruments/Massachusetts Institute of Technology. The main reason why a corpus of telephone speech was created was to train speech recognition software. In the Blizzard challenge, different software has the obligation to convert audio recordings into textual data and the TIMIT corpus was used as a standardized baseline.

Machine Learning Method Comparison

See also
 Comparison of datasets in machine learning

References

External links
 TIMIT Acoustic-Phonetic Continuous Speech Corpus

Applied linguistics
Computational linguistics
Corpora
Dialectology
Linguistic research
Phonetics
Speech recognition
Speech processing
Datasets in machine learning